This is the list of cathedrals in Belgium sorted by denomination.

Roman Catholic 

Cathedrals of the Roman Catholic Church in Belgium:

 Cathedral of Our Lady in Antwerp
 Abbatial Cathedral of St. James in Coudenberg, Brussels (of the Military Ordinariate of Belgium)
 Cathedral of the Saviour and St. Donat in Bruges
 St Bavo Cathedral in Ghent
 St. Quentin Cathedral in Hasselt
 Cathedral of St. Paul in Liège
 Cathedral of St. Rombald in Mechelen
 Co-Cathedral of St. Michael and St. Gudula in Brussels
 Cathedral of St. Alban in Namur
 Cathedral of Our Lady of Tournai in Tournai

Anglican
Church of England Cathedrals in Belgium:
 Holy Trinity Pro-Cathedral in Brussels

Eastern Orthodox
Russian Orthodox Cathedrals in Belgium:
 The Cathedral Church of St. Nicholas in Brussels
Greek Orthodox (Patriarchate of Constantinople) Cathedrals in Belgium:
 Cathedral of the Holy Archangels Michael and Gabriel in Brussels

See also

List of cathedrals

References

 
Belgium
Cathedrals
Cathedrals